The Order of the Sword is an honor awarded within the United States Air Force. It is a special program where noncommisioned officers of a command recognize individuals they hold in high esteem and wish to honor. Those selected for induction are usually honored during a formal ceremony at a dining-in.  The honor can be awarded at the unit level or (more rarely) at the Air Force level.

The U.S. Army and Marine Corps lack such an honor bestowed by the enlisted corps upon the officer corps.  The U.S. Navy has the title of "Honorary Chief Petty Officer."

The origin of the tradition is that:

The Order of the Sword recognizes individuals who have made significant contributions to the enlisted corps. Only seven other individuals have been so honored since 1978. The ceremonial presentation was adopted from the Royal Order of the Sword and passed to the United States during the Revolutionary War. However, it lay dormant until it was reinstituted in its current form in 1967.

The original order of the sword was patterned after two orders of chivalry founded during the Middle Ages in Europe: the (British) Royal Order of the Sword and the Swedish Military Order of the Sword, still in existence today. In 1522, King Gustavus I of Sweden ordered the noblemen commissioned by him to appoint officers to serve him, and these people became known as the noncommissioned officers.

Recipients

Source:

References

External links 
 

Awards and decorations of the United States Air Force
Awards established in 1967
1967 establishments in the United States